Francesca Romana Coluzzi (20 May 1943 – 15 July 2009) was an Italian actress. A respected dramatic actress on stage, she is probably best known for her roles in the commedia sexy all'italiana.

Life and career 
Born in Tirana, Albania of Italian parents, Coluzzi soon moved in Italy with her family to Perugia.

As a teenager, during a student twist dancing contest, Federico Fellini noticed her and offered her a role in 8½. Coluzzi declined the offer to continue her studies, but however the encounter with Fellini marked her life, and she eventually decided to leave the university to pursue a career in the cinema.

She started her career as a body double, first of Mylène Demongeot in Fantômas and later of Marisa Mell in Danger: Diabolik. In 1965, at 22, Coluzzi made her acting debut in the Lucio Fulci's comedy film 002 Operazione Luna.

Her breakout role came in 1969, with the role of Asmara, the Adriano Celentano's lover in Pietro Germi's Serafino. One year later she played Tarsilla Tettamanzi in Alberto Lattuada's Come Have Coffee with Us, and for this role she won a Nastro d'Argento for best supporting actress and a Globo d'oro in the same category. In the following years Coluzzi was mainly active in comedy films, especially in the commedia sexy all'italiana genre, often playing roles of unbearable and jealous wives. In 1985 she founded in Rome a theater workshop for children, Associazione Culturale Minestrone d'Arte. She died at 66 of lung cancer.

Selected filmography
 The Cousin (1974)
 Banzai (1997)

References

External links 
 

Italian film actresses
1943 births
People from Tirana
2009 deaths
20th-century Italian actresses
Nastro d'Argento winners
Italian television actresses
Italian stage actresses
Deaths from lung cancer in Lazio